Flötjan is a small rocky islet in Finland. It is located in the Åland Sea to the southwest of Lågskär.

Lighthouse
The original light was badly damaged during World War II. A concrete lighthouse tower was built in 1953 and automated in 1959. The Stockholm-Mariehamn-Tallinn ferry passes just to the west of the island.

See also

List of lighthouses in Åland

References

Landforms of Åland
Finnish islands in the Baltic
Lighthouses in Finland